Roger Leigh-Wood (né Wood, 16 August 1906 – 1 March 1987) was an English athlete who competed for Great Britain in the 1928 Summer Olympics.

He was born in Paddington and died in Alton.

In 1928 he was a member of the British relay team which finished fifth in the 4×400 metre relay event. In the 400 metres competition he was eliminated in the quarter-finals.

At the 1930 Empire Games he won the gold medal with the English team in the 4×440 yards relay contest and the silver medal in the 440 yards hurdles event.

External links
sports-reference.com

1906 births
1987 deaths
English male sprinters
English male hurdlers
Olympic athletes of Great Britain
Athletes (track and field) at the 1928 Summer Olympics
Athletes (track and field) at the 1930 British Empire Games
Commonwealth Games gold medallists for England
Commonwealth Games silver medallists for England
Commonwealth Games medallists in athletics
Medallists at the 1930 British Empire Games